Katharina is a feminine given name. It is a German form of Katherine. It may refer to:

In television and film:
Katharina Bellowitsch, Austrian radio and TV presenter
Katharina Mückstein, Austrian film director
Katharina Thalbach, German actress and film director
Katherine Pierce, a character in The Vampire Diaries originally named Katharina Petrova.

In artistry:
Katharina Fröhlich, lover of Franz Grillparzer
Katharina Rapp, German artist

In other fields:
Katharina Baunach, German footballer
Katharina Dalton, British physician and pioneer in the research of premenstrual stress syndrome.
Katharina Klafsky, Hungarian operatic singer
Katharina von Bora, German Catholic nun who was an early convert to Protestantism.
Katharina von Zimmern (1478-1547), last abbess of the Fraumünster Abbey

See also
320 Katharina, small Main belt asteroid
Katharina, a genus of chiton mollusc in the family Mopaliidae
The Lost Honour of Katharina Blum, 1974 novel by Heinrich Böll
Catherina (and similar spellings)

References